The 2004 French Open boys' singles tournament was an event during the 2004 French Open tennis tournament. Stanislas Wawrinka was the defending champion, but did not compete in the Juniors in this year.

Gaël Monfils won in the final 6–2, 6–2, against Alex Kuznetsov.

Seeds

Draw

Finals

Top half

Section 1

Section 2

Bottom half

Section 3

Section 4

Sources

ITF Tennis

Boys' Singles
2004